The Venezuela men's national field hockey team represents Venezuela in men's international field hockey competitions. The team is controlled by the Venezuelan Field Hockey Federation, the governing body for field hockey in Venezuela.

Tournament record

Pan American Games
1983 – 8th place
1991 – 8th place

Pan American Cup
2000 – 10th place
2004 – 11th place
2017 – 8th place

Central American and Caribbean Games
1990 – 
1994 – 6th place
1998 – 7th place
2002 – 4th place
2006 – 6th place

South American Games
2014 – 
2018 – 4th place

South American Championship
2008 – 6th place
2010 – 5th place
2016 –

Pan American Challenge
2015 – 
 2021 – Withdrew

Hockey World League
2012–13 – Round 1
2016–17 – Round 1

FIH Hockey Series
2018–19 – First round

Bolivarian Games
2013 –

Alba Games
 2007 –  6th place

See also
Venezuela women's national field hockey team

References

Americas men's national field hockey teams
Field Hockey
National team